Sheldon Reynolds may refer to:

Sheldon Reynolds (producer) (1923–2003), American television producer
Sheldon Reynolds (guitarist) (born 1959), American guitarist with Earth, Wind and Fire

See also
Sheldon Reynolds Falls, a waterfall in Ricketts Glen State Park, Pennsylvania, United States